Uff Meri Family was a 2014 Pakistani sitcom directed by Azfar Ali, written by Hassan Ali and produced by Misbah Khalid of M&M Productions. It stars Naveen Waqar, Azfar Ali, Saif-e-Hassan and Amber Wajid. At 3rd Hum Awards it won Hum Award for Best Comic Sitcom.

Cast 
 Naveen Waqar
 Azfar Ali
 Saif-e-Hassan
 Amber Khan
 Bilal

Awards

 Hum Award for Best Comic Sitcom - Misbah Khalid (M&M Productions).

See also
 Halka Na Lo
 Extras (The Mango People)

References

External links 
 official website
 

2014 Pakistani television series debuts
Urdu-language television shows
Pakistani television sitcoms
Hum TV original programming
2014 Pakistani television series endings